The William Ailes House (a.k.a. "Bellevue") is a historic house in Natchez, Mississippi.

Location
It is located at 657 South Canal Street in Natchez, Mississippi.

History
It was built by Thomas Bowen in the 1850s in the Greek Revival architectural style.

It has been listed on the National Register of Historic Places listings since March 12, 1980.

References

Houses on the National Register of Historic Places in Mississippi
Houses in Natchez, Mississippi
Greek Revival houses in Mississippi
National Register of Historic Places in Natchez, Mississippi